Saurida undosquamis, the brushtooth lizardfish, large-scale grinner or largescale saury, is a type of lizardfish, a demersal species that occurs in the Eastern Indian Ocean, Malay Peninsula, northern Java, Arafura Sea, Louisiade Archipelago, southern Philippines and northern Australia,. Reports of its occurrence in the Red Sea region and introduction to the Mediterranean are questionable,.

References

External links
 Fishes of Australia : Saurida undosquamis

brushtooth lizardfish
Marine fish of Northern Australia
brushtooth lizardfish